Mobile Communication and Society: A Global Perspective is a book by Manuel Castells, Mireia Fernandez-Ardevol, Jack Linchuan Qui, and Araba Sey published by The MIT Press (2007,  alk.paper, Pp 331) that looks at the impact of mobile phone technology.

It argues: "Wireless networks are the fastest growing communications technology in history. Are mobile phones expressions of identity, fashionable gadgets, tools for life -- or all of the above? 'Mobile Communications and Society' looks at how the possibility of multimodal communications from anywhere to anywhere at any time affects everyday life at home, at work, and at school, and raises broader concerns about politics and culture both global and local."

This book says its data was "gathered from around the world" and authors take a look at "who has access to wireless technology, and why, and analyze the patterns of social differential seen in unequal access." It touches issues in countries and continent as diverse as the United States, China, Europe, Latin America and Africa.

Its chapters are: 

 Opening: Our Networks, Our Lives
 The Diffusion of Wireless Communications in the World
 The Social Differentiation of Wireless Communication Users: Age, Gender, Ethnicity, and Socioeconomic Status
 Communication and Mobility in Everyday Life
 The Mobile Youth Culture
 The Space of Flows, Timeless Time, and Mobile Networks
 The Language of Wireless Communication
 The Mobile Civil Society: Social Movements, Political Power, and Communication Networks
 Wireless Communication and Global Development: New Issues, New Strategies
 Conclusion: The Mobile Network Society

Business books
2007 books
MIT Press books